The Gilt-bronze Incense Burner of Baekje was designated as the 287th National Treasure of Korea on May 30, 1996. Currently housed at the Buyeo National Museum, it was originally excavated at an ancient temple site in Neungsan-ri, Buyeo County in Chungcheongnam-do in 1993. The incense burner was the largest find among the 450 artifacts excavated.

The Gilt-bronze Incense Burner of Baekje is a symbol of the artistry of the Baekje people and a masterpiece of Korean art.

The incense burner measures 64 centimeters in height, the body is 19 centimeters in diameter, and weighs 11.8 kilograms. It was probably made in the 6th century.

History
"One of the crowning excavation achievements in the past century, the Baekje Gilt-Bronze Incense Burner, gave a critical turning point to the studies in the Baekje Dynasty history. The Burner embraces the mind of the Baekje people who delicately chased their ideal world with exquisite techniques and high appreciative eyes. The Incense Burner of this kind has not been found anywhere in the world since then. It is no wonder that it can be really called a masterpiece", according to the Culture and Tourism website published by Chungcheongnam-do.

It had been widely believed the Baekje incense burner might have been copied from the Baksan (Hangul: 박산 향로, Hanja: 博山香爐) burners of Han Dynasty until recently when a Korean research team comprising historians and archaeologists made a great discovery that it differed from the ancient Chinese prototypes in its structure and designs, particularly in view of its five musicians in relief, which did not constitute the ornamental design element of the Han dynasty incense burners. In addition, one musical instrument in relief gave another clue to the study. The musical instrument called 'Wanham' (Hangul: 완함, Hanja: 阮咸) was first introduced to the Tang Dynasty in the 7th century after the Baekje kingdom disappeared into oblivion.  
The musical instrument came to be widely popular later in the 8th century, during the Tang Dynasty, according to the New Book of Tang (Traditional Chinese: 新唐書, which also showed the name of the instrument 'Wanham', named eponymically after a then-prominent artist of the Tang period about a century later than when the Baekje incense burner was made. The 'Wanham' originated from Kucha, where in the Kizil Caves the earliest form of this musical instrument can still be seen.

The Baekje burner uses realism and is three-dimensional. The incense burner incorporates Buddhist and Taoist themes but some theorize that the burner symbolizes themes of Northeast Asian culture. The dragon and phoenix suggest a yin and yang motif, and because it was excavated from what was probably a Buddhist temple, this theory has some weight.  However, the uniqueness of the artifact suggests that the burner may have been used for ancestral rites or other unique ceremonies.

Appearance
The incense burner can be classified in four parts: the body, lid, the phoenix-shaped knob, and the support plate.

The lid is encircled by 74 mountains thinly cast in five layers reaching the top. The lid also contains various figures cast in relief including five musicians with different instruments, sixteen other figures, and thirty-nine animals including tigers, dragons, and deer. The lid also has different kinds of scenery including six types of trees, boulders, trails, waterfalls, and lakes which may symbolize the ideal landscape of a Taoist hermit. Five birds sit at the top of the five highest peaks of the mountain, and the top of the lid is crowned with a dragon. The lid is also ventilated with five holes, one in the chest of the phoenix, to release the scent of the incense.

The top of the lid is capped with a bonghwang (phoenix) which holds a magic pearl.  The tail of the bonghwang curves out in an arching fashion.

The body of the burner is shaped in the form of a blossoming lotus. The petals of the lotus also contain twenty-six animals on the lateral surface including fish, heavenly beasts, and birds. Some of the animals rest between the lotus petals, while others are top.

The support plate is in the shape of a dragon with its mouth facing the base of the body which it supports.  The dragon is surrounded by a blowing bronze motif of clouds, and its own tail is arched, giving the base a sense of movement.

Archaeological significance
The discovery that this archaeological find is different from the Han Dynasty incense burners means a lot to historians, archaeologists and bibliographers internationally. The fact that the musical instrument originated from Kucha, which provided an oasis and gateway to the Silk Road,
sheds new light onto the then-current geopolitical equilibrium, cultural exchanges, and trade routes extending towards the three kingdoms on the Korean Peninsula and ancient Japan as well.
In other words, the musical instrument, even before it was eponymically named wanham in the Tang Dynasty, found its way into the Baekje incense burner.

See also
 Buyeo National Museum
 List of Baekje-related topics
 National treasures of Korea
 Three Kingdoms of Korea

External links
 Buyeo National Museum
 Korean National Heritage
 Cultural Heritage Administration
 Culture and Tourism
 Seoul Selection

Baekje
National Treasures of South Korea
Bronze sculptures in South Korea
Bronzeware
Incense equipment
1993 archaeological discoveries